Paw was an American rock band from Lawrence, Kansas, that was formed in 1990. The band's original line-up consisted of vocalist Mark Hennessy, guitarist Grant Fitch, bassist Charles Bryan, and drummer Peter Fitch. They released two studio albums – Dragline and Death To Traitors, the B-side and outtake collection Keep The Last Bullet For Yourself and the EP Home Is a Strange Place before disbanding in 2000. On two occasions they have reunited.

History 
Paw was formed in 1990 in Lawrence, alongside Kill Creek and Stick. Their work from this era can best be characterized as aggressive rock with melodic undertones, or 'Southern rock' as Hennessy explained in an MTV interview. They were frequently cited by industry insiders as potentially "the next Nirvana", and a bidding war erupted to sign them. The band signed a three-album deal with A&M Records during the height of the grunge wave, and released their first album, Dragline, in 1993. Their most well-known songs are from this period which received moderate rotation on the radio and on Headbangers Ball, MTV's hard rock/heavy metal showcase. Music videos were made for the hits "Jessie", "Couldn't Know" and "Sleeping Bag". Paw toured the UK in 1993 supporting Tool with Headswim (months after Tool's UK support slot with Rage Against the Machine), introducing the band to an audience outside of America. The band recorded two sessions for BBC Radio 1's rock show in 1993 (during which they played the Reading Festival). Their songs "Jessie", "Pansy" and "The Bridge" (plus an alternate version of the video of the first) were used in the 3DO, PC, Sega Saturn and PlayStation versions of the video game Road Rash.

In 1995, the band released its second album, Death To Traitors, on A&M Records, recorded as a three-piece following the departure of bass player Charles Bryan; guitarist Grant Fitch doubled up on bass for the recording. During this period, the band evolved by adding more instrumental and country elements to soften their hard rock edge. The band toured Europe and the UK in early 1995, as well as touring Australia in October 1995. While the album received favorable reviews from the press, sales were less successful, and Paw was dropped by A&M in 1996, before their contract was fulfilled.

In 1998, Grant Fitch, Peter Fitch and Dan Hines formed the band Palomar and released the album World Without Horses. A reviewer described Palomar as "a gentler and more melodic sound than Paw." Paw also released a full-length compilation of B-sides and rarities entitled Keep The Last Bullet For Yourself on their own label, Outlaw Records. Paw still played together during this period, and both World Without Horses and Keep The Last Bullet For Yourself were released on these shows.

In 2000, founding members Hennessy and Fitch signed Paw with Koch Records and released the mini-album Home Is A Strange Place the same year. The new album incorporated a more pronounced southern rock element. After that they split.

Post-Paw activities 
Former bassist Charles Bryan, who left Paw in 1994, retired from the music industry altogether to be a professional skydiver.

Hennessy's book of poetry, Cue the Bedlam (More Desperate with Longing Than Want of Air), was published in December 2005 by Unholy Day Press. He joined in on vocals with Mike Ratzo (bass guitar, vocals and guitar), Justin Parr (drums), Brody Buster (guitar, harmonica and keys), Heather Lofflin (vocals and guitar), James Garvic (bass guitar and guitar) and Kurt Nesbitt (bass guitar) in The Diamond Heart Club in Lawrence, from 2006-2007. They reformed under the name 1950 D.A. (without Garvic and Nesbitt) and made a 6-song EP called Low Like Planes. Around the web can be found a song by The Diamond Heart Club, under the name of "Track 5", which is instead "Return To Zero" later redone by 1950 D.A.

In 2008, after being scheduled on the same bill between their post-Paw bands, Hennessy and Fitch returned and played together on June 6, 2008, at the Revival Tent at the Wakarusa Festival in Clinton Lake, Kansas. The band played its first headlining reunion show in Lawrence on Saturday, October 4, 2008, at The Bottleneck.

Grant Fitch and Jason Jones formed The New Franklin Panthers, in Lawrence. They have released on Bandcamp Hot Dogs Are Cool: In III Movements on February 1, 2008 and the Circus Act EP (with Dan Hines) on January 13, 2011. Grant self-released Gman Rides Again on July 26, 2012 and re-released World Without Horses (under the name Grant Finch and Palomar). Grant is currently occupied as a Production Manager on a number of productions, including the television series The Inspectors, and the 2018 thriller Faceless, and runs a production company, Electrical Odyssey.

In 2014, Mark Hennessy started Godzillionaire (with Michael Dye, Cody Romaine and Benjamin White). After releasing some demos they released in 2016 $mall ¢hange and in 2017 the EP the great dEPression. In November and December 2017 they took offline their sites while on legal litigation with the lawyers of the Godzilla's copyright owners, but on January 5 the band announced the litigation was over and they can still use their name.

Mark Hennessy announced he would perform the whole Dragline album at The First Annual Corn King Music and Arts Festival in September. Although it was not a Paw reunion (as it was misunderstooded by fans) but a tribute by his band Godzillionaire (for the occasion a quintet with Dan Duncan), this is the actual first time he performed Paw songs since he formed Godzillionaire (and since the last Paw reunion).

Members 
 Mark Hennessy – vocals (1990–2000, 2008)
 Grant Fitch – guitar (1990–2000, 2008)
 Peter Fitch – drums (1990–1998)
 Charles "Chuck The Truck" Bryan – bass (1990–1994)
 Jason Magierowski – bass (1995–1996, 2000, 2008)
 Dan Hines – bass (1996–1998)

Session members
 Paul Boblett & John "Speck" Licardello – additional bass on Death to Traitors
 Steve Henry – additional guitar on Home Is a Strange Place
 J. Hall – additional drums on Home Is a Strange Place

Timeline

Discography

Studio albums
Dragline (1993), A&M Records
Death to Traitors (1995), A&M Records

EP
Home Is a Strange Place (2000), Koch International

Rarities compilations
Keep the Last Bullet for Yourself (1998), self-released on Outlaw Records
Palomar's World Without Horses
 "Beggars Love Thieves"
 "Deer Park Road"
 "Pocketknife"
 "Substance of the Saints"
 "World Without My Soul"
 "Walk into the Sky"
 "Watermark"
 "Birds of Prey"
 "On the Hoof"
 "I Live in Darkness"

Originally self-released in 1998 on Outlaw Records, re-released on bandcamp on 2012 (with "Pocketknife" moved at the beginning)

B-sides
All released in singles on A&M Records. 
Dragline era: "Imaginary Lover" (Atlanta Rhythm Section cover), "Suicide Shift", "Slow Burn", "Jessie" (acoustic live at WERS-FM radio, Boston, on 11/29/93), "I Know Where You Sleep", songs from the BBC Radio One "Rock Sessions" of October 1993 (broadcast on November 7)
S.F.W. soundtrack (1994): "Surrender" (Cheap Trick cover)
Death To Traitors era: "School" (Nirvana cover), "Kid Cotton"

Rare tracks
 Nasty Pope Records demos (all the songs were rerecorded for the first album)
 An unplugged show live at WERS radio (where the B-side acoustic version of "Jessie" was taken). Some songs from the then-upcoming album sessions were also played.
 Death to Traitors demos (from the complete session bootleg). Many songs where left as outtakes: "30 Days", "Remora", "Kitchen" (called on bootlegs "The Kitchen Is No Place for a Man"), "Texas" (alternate version with Mark on lead vocals) and four songs without official names (called "Learn to See", "Year of the Locust", "Lost Highway" and "Goodbye Dress")
 "Street Justice" (Twisted Sister cover, outtake of the Strangeland soundtrack (recorded July 1998, released on the fall of 1998 on the Keep the Last Bullet for Yourself compilation)
 "Gold Dust Woman" (Fleetwood Mac short cover which introduced "Lolita" in early shows)
 "Pansy" (alternate version) and a "Pink Floyd tribute jam" (in one occasion, Kansas '98, the band started playing "Pansy" but Mark started instead with other lyrics, the band followed and then ended with the regular version of "Pansy". But Mark's voice started giving out pretty bad towards the end of the concert, and for giving him a break they started an instrumental jam. However Mark sang some verses from Pink Floyd's "Mother")
 "Innocuous" and ""Filled Up" (in one occasion, 1999 at the CBGB's, a friend of the band named Steve Tulipana substituted for Mark and with him they played these two songs. When Mark returned they rerecorded "Innocuous" as Betty & Mike)
 "Simple Man" (cover of Lynyrd Skynyrd from their last show in 2000)
 Home Is a Strange Place demos (from the Cross the Tracks bootleg, name taken from the early name of the album). Two songs, "St. Jude" (a rerecorded, or an early version, of Palomar's "Substance of the Saints") and "Two Brothers", were not added on the album for budget reasons.

References

External links
Paw's official website

American grunge groups
Musical groups established in 1990
Musical groups disestablished in 2000
Musical groups reestablished in 2008
Musical groups disestablished in 2008
Alternative rock groups from Kansas
Musicians from Lawrence, Kansas
MNRK Music Group artists
A&M Records artists